This is a list of fictional diaries categorized by type, including fictional works in diary form, diaries appearing in fictional works, and hoax diaries.

The first category, fictional works in diary form, lists fictional works where the story, or a major part of the story, is told in the form of a character's diary. Diary form is frequently used in fiction for young adults and tweens as well as adults. It has been used for multiple books in a series following the diarist's life over many years, such as the Adrian Mole series, the Diary of a Wimpy Kid series, and the Dork Diaries series, all of which chronicle the lives of characters who start a diary as children or adolescents and continue their diary as they mature over time. Fictionalised diaries set during distinct historical periods or events have been used since at least the 1970s to bring history to life for young people. Dear America, My Australian Story and related series are recent examples of this genre. The form is also frequently used for fiction about adult women's lives, some notable examples being Bridget Jones's Diary, The Color Purple, and Pamela.

The second category lists fictional works that are not written in diary form, but in which a character keeps a diary, or a diary is otherwise featured as part of the story. Some common uses for diaries in fiction are to reveal to the reader material that is concealed from other characters, to divulge information about past events, or as a device to provide real or false evidence to investigators in mystery or crime fiction. Examples of diaries being used in one of these ways include Amy Dunne's false diary in Gone Girl and Laura Palmer's secret diary in Twin Peaks.

The third category lists hoax diaries, that were presented as being true diaries of real people when first published, but were later discovered to be fiction. Go Ask Alice, the first of a number of books by Beatrice Sparks purported to be based on diaries of real teenagers, was originally presented by Sparks as the non-fictional diary of an anonymous teenage girl, but was later classified by publishers as fiction.

Fictional works in diary form
 Anorak's Almanac by James Donovan Halliday
The Adrian Mole series by Sue Townsend
Alice, I Think by Susan Juby
The Amazing Days of Abby Hayes series by Anne Mazer
The American Diary of a Japanese Girl by Yone Noguchi
Any Human Heart:The Intimate Journals of Logan Mountstuart by William Boyd
The Basic Eight by Daniel Handler
Bert diaries by Anders Jacobsson and Sören Olsson.
The Book of the New Sun by Gene Wolfe
Bridget Jones's Diary by Helen Fielding
The Book of Ebenezer Le Page by G. B. Edwards
The Bunker Diary by Kevin Brooks
California Diaries (series) by Ann M. Martin
Catherine, Called Birdy by Karen Cushman
Charmed Thirds by Megan McCafferty
The Color Purple by Alice Walker
Confessions of Georgia Nicolson by Louise Rennison
Dangling Man by Saul Bellow
 Dear America, Dear Canada and My America, series of historical novels for children in the form of diaries
Dear Dumb Diary by Jim Benton
The Debt to Pleasure by John Lanchester
Diary by Chuck Palahniuk
Diary of a Chav by Grace Dent
Diary of a Country Priest by Georges Bernanos
The Diary of Ellen Rimbauer: My Life at Rose Red by Ridley Pearson
The Diaries of Emilio Renzi (3 volumes: The Formative Years, The Happy Years, A Day in the Life) by Ricardo Piglia
"Diary of a Madman" by Nikolai Gogol; this title has also been used by Lu Xun and Guy de Maupassant
Diary of a Nobody by George Grossmith and Weedon Grossmith
Diary of a Pilgrimage by Jerome K Jerome
The Diary of Samuel Marchbanks by Robertson Davies
Diary of a Seducer by Søren Kierkegaard
Diary of a Somebody by Christopher Matthew
Diary of a Wimpy Kid by Jeff Kinney
Dinotopia by James Gurney
Don't You Dare Read This, Mrs. Dunphrey by Margaret Peterson Haddix
Dork Diaries by Rachel Renée Russell
Double Eclipse by Melissa de la Cruz
Dracula by Bram Stoker
Flowers for Algernon by Daniel Keyes
From the Files of Madison Finn series by Laura Dower
A Gathering of Days by Joan W. Blos
Gentlemen Prefer Blondes by Anita Loos
Go Ask Malice: A Slayer's Diary by Robert Joseph Levy
Hidden Passions: Secrets from the Diaries of Tabitha Lenox by Alice Alfonsi and James E. Reilly
The Horla by Guy de Maupassant
Houseboy by Ferdinand Oyono
I Capture the Castle by Dodie Smith
I Trissy by Norma Fox Mazer
Jazmin's Notebook by Nikki Grimes
A Journal of the Plague Year by Daniel Defoe
The Lacuna by Barbara Kingsolver
The Little White Bird by J.M. Barrie
Love That Dog by Sharon Creech
The Lost Diaries of Nigel Molesworth by Geoffrey Willans
The Lost Journal of Indiana Jones by Henry Jones Jr.
The Luminous Novel by Mario Levrero
Mémoires d'Hadrien (Memoirs of Hadrian) by Marguerite Yourcenar
Memoirs of Miss Sidney Bidulph by Frances Sheridan
The Memory Book of Starr Faithfull: A Novel by Gloria Vanderbilt
Michael: A German Destiny in Diary Form by Joseph Goebbels
The Moneypenny Diaries by Samantha Weinberg (under the pseudonym Kate Westbrook)
A Month of Sundays by John Updike
The Moth Diaries by Rachel Klein
My Story, My Australian Story, My Story (New Zealand), My Name Is America, series of historical novels for children in the form of diaries
Myra Breckinridge by Gore Vidal
Nausea by Jean-Paul Sartre
Notes on a Scandal by Zoë Heller
Pamela by Samuel Richardson
Parable of the Sower by Octavia E. Butler
Parable of the Talents by Octavia E. Butler
The Pendragon Adventure by D. J. MacHale (a series of ten novels)
Penny Pollard's Diary by Robin Klein
The Princess Diaries by Meg Cabot
The Secret Diary of Laura Palmer by Jennifer Lynch
The Story of B by Daniel Quinn
Random Acts of Senseless Violence by Jack Womack
Runaway by Wendelin Van Draanen
Second Helpings by Megan McCafferty
The Secret Diary of Adrian Mole, Aged 13¾ by Sue Townsend
The Secret Diary of Anne Boleyn by Robin Maxwell
Sloppy Firsts by Megan McCafferty
So Much To Tell You by John Marsden
Spud by John van de Ruit
Spud: the Madness Continues by John van de Ruit
Suzanne's Diary for Nicholas by James Patterson
The Tale of Murasaki by Liza Dalby
The Turner Diaries by William Luther Pierce (under the pseudonym Andrew MacDonald)
The Vampire Diaries by L. J. Smith (This has only partial diary entries in diary format. The rest of the book is in text form.)
The Yellow Wallpaper by Charlotte Perkins Gilman
Youth in Revolt by C.D. Pyane
Z for Zachariah by Robert C. O'Brien
Z213: Exit by Dimitris Lyacos
Various works edited by Beatrice Sparks (author of Go Ask Alice) including:
Jay's Journal (1979) (Some material may have been taken from a real diary kept by Alden Barrett, a Utah teenager who committed suicide.) 
It Happened to Nancy: By an Anonymous Teenager (1994)
Almost Lost: The True Story of an Anonymous Teenager's Life on the Streets (1996)
It's My Candle: By an Anonymous Teenager - A True Story from His Diary (1996)
Annie's Baby: The Diary of Anonymous, A Pregnant Teenager (1998)
Treacherous Love: The Diary of an Anonymous Teenager (2000)
Kim: Empty Inside: The Diary of an Anonymous Teenager (2002) (The U.S. Copyright Office has noted that some material for this book was taken from a pre-existing diary.)
Finding Katie : The Diary of Anonymous, A Teenager in Foster Care (2005)

Diaries appearing in fictional works
An Unkindness of Ghosts by Rivers Solomon: Lune keeps journals. 
The Basic Eight by Daniel Handler: Flannery Culp keeps diaries. 
Cloud Atlas: Sections of the novel deal with the Pacific Journal of Adam Ewing.
Doctor Who (television series): The Doctor keeps a "500 year diary", Joan Redfern keeps "A Journal of Impossible Things", and Melody Pond/ River Song keeps "River Song's Diary".  
Elfquest (comics): Cam Triomphe keeps a diary (mentioned in the sub-series Fire-Eye and The Rebels).
The End of the Affair by Graham Greene: Part of the narrative is revealed through a diary stolen from Sarah by the narrator, Maurice Bendrix.
Future Diary (manga and anime): The combatants of the battle royale game each have their own unique cellphone diary with special abilities of describing the future.
Gone Girl by Gillian Flynn: Amy Dunne keeps a diary.
Harry Potter and the Chamber of Secrets by J. K. Rowling: A magical diary created by Tom Riddle plays a role in the story and is eventually destroyed.
Homestuck: Mindfang keeps a journal. Rose chronicles her adventures within Sburb.
Indiana Jones and the Last Crusade (film): Dr. Henry Walton Jones Sr. keeps a "Grail Diary".
John Winchesters diary in the TV show Supernatural: The diary Sam and Dean's father keeps to record a list of supernatural creatures.
Lolita by Vladimir Nabokov: The narrator Humbert keeps a diary, where he records his secret thoughts about Lolita and her mother.
Low Red Moon by Caitlín R. Kiernan: Caroline Snow keeps a diary.
Mort and other Discworld books by Terry Pratchett: The diaries of every sentient being ever to live on the Discworld appear.
Mother Night by Kurt Vonnegut: Memoirs of a Monogamous Casanova, the erotic diary of the protagonist, Howard W. Campbell.
Mrs Dale's Diary (BBC Radio Series): The diary mentioned in the title is part of the story.  
The Saga of Darren Shan by Darren Shan: The character Darren Shan keeps a diary.
Star Trek episodes often contain entries in the Captain's log.
Superman (comics): Superman keeps a giant-sized diary at his Fortress of Solitude.
The Tenant of Wildfell Hall by Anne Brontë: The character Helen Graham gives the narrator Gilbert Markham her diaries to read; the diaries constitute the second volume of the novel.
Twin Peaks (television series) by David Lynch: Laura Palmer keeps a diary.
V for Vendetta: Dr Delia Surrige keeps a diary.
Voyage of the Dawn Treader by C. S. Lewis: Eustace Clarence Scrubb keeps a diary.
The Vampire Diaries (television series): Elena Gilbert, Jonathan Gilbert, and Stefan Salvatore all keep journals.
Watchmen: The vigilante Rorschach keeps a journal which becomes a significant plot point.

Hoax diaries

Go Ask Alice by Beatrice Sparks (1971)
Hitler Diaries by Konrad Kujau (1983)
Mussolini diaries
The Diary of a Farmer's Wife 1796-1797 by Anne Hughes
Three medical diaries by John Knyveton (actually by Ernest Gray):
The Diary of a Surgeon in the Year 1751–1752 (1938)
Surgeon's Mate: the diary of John Knyveton, surgeon in the British fleet during the Seven Years War 1756–1762 (1942)
Man midwife; the further experiences of John Knyveton, M.D., late surgeon in the British fleet, during the years 1763–1809 (1946)
Diary of Elizabeth Pepys (1991) by Dale Spender
The Journal of Mrs Pepys (1998) by Sara George.

See also
Epistolary novel
List of diarists

References

Diaries
Diaries
 
Diaries